Norton railway station was a station near Norton, a village to the east of Runcorn, Cheshire, England. It was located just north of the 1.25 mile (2 km) Sutton Tunnel and was built as a result of the recommendations of a Board of Trade enquiry into a fatal accident in the tunnel the previous year.

It was opened by the Birkenhead, Lancashire & Cheshire Joint Railway company on 18 December 1850; originally named Norton, it was renamed Norton (Cheshire) in 1926; and it was closed to passenger traffic by the British Transport Commission on 1 September 1952. Most of the station has since been demolished, but the old station house remains in use as a private dwelling and there is a signal box nearby that still bears this name.

References

Further reading

External links
Norton @ Disused Stations

Disused railway stations in the Borough of Halton
Former Birkenhead Railway stations
Railway stations in Great Britain opened in 1850
Railway stations in Great Britain closed in 1952